Per Se is a New American and French restaurant located at The Shops at Columbus Circle, on the fourth floor of the Deutsche Bank Center at 10 Columbus Circle in Manhattan, New York City, owned by chef Thomas Keller. The Chef de Cuisine is Chad Palagi. Per Se has maintained three Michelin stars since the introduction of the New York City Guide in 2006.

Development
Thomas Keller opened Per Se in February 2004. Keller also owns The French Laundry and Ad Hoc in Napa Valley; Bouchon in Napa Valley, Las Vegas, and Los Angeles; and Bouchon Bakery in Napa Valley. According to Keller's website, he is "the first and only American-born chef to hold multiple three-star ratings" by Michelin.

Keller chose restaurant/hotel designer Adam Tihany to draw together subtle references to The French Laundry and elements from both his and Keller's pasts; for example, the decorative blue door at the main entrance is modeled after the blue door at The French Laundry.

Per Se offers two nine-course tasting menus for $355, one vegetarian, and a five-course menu for $245. These menus are prix fixe, but guests may choose upgrades that may increase the menu price up to $800. According to Per Se, the wine list includes 2000 wines.

The restaurant has three dining rooms. The East Room is the entry to the other two rooms and serves the five-course menu in salon chairs and lower tables. The Main Dining Room serves the nine-course menus, and the West Room offers private dining. All rooms offer views of Columbus Circle, Central Park, and some Midtown and Upper East Side skyline.

Ratings and reviews

Per Se was awarded three stars ("Exceptional cuisine, worth a special journey") in the 2006 inaugural Michelin Guide to New York City, and has maintained that rating every year to date.

Since 2013, it has been the recipient of the AAA Five Star Award.

, Zagat gives Per Se a rating of 4.6/5 for food, putting it in their top 50 restaurants of New York City.

Since 2013, Per Se has been a recipient of the Wine Spectator Grand Award. It made the La Liste Top Ten (#2), and was recognized by L'Art et Manière for Outstanding Service in 2016. It has been awarded five stars (highest rating) by the Forbes Travel Guide annually since 2005.

In 2011, it was called the best restaurant in New York City by critic Sam Sifton of The New York Times in a four-star review. This rating was downgraded to two-stars by Sifton's successor, Pete Wells, in 2016. Explaining this change in the updated review, he wrote, "With each fresh review, a restaurant has to earn its stars again. In its current form and at its current price, Per Se struggled and failed to do this, ranging from respectably dull at best to disappointingly flat-footed at worst."

See also
 List of New American restaurants
 List of Michelin 3-star restaurants in the United States

References

External links
 
 Archive of Per Se Menus

French restaurants in New York City
Restaurants in Manhattan
Michelin Guide starred restaurants in New York (state)
Restaurants established in 2004
New American restaurants in New York (state)
2004 establishments in New York City
Fine dining